WDWW-LD, virtual and UHF digital channel 28, is a low-powered CBN News-affiliated television station licensed to Cleveland, Georgia, United States. The station is owned by DTV America Corporation. Its transmitter is located on Horsetrough Mountain on the western part of the White/Hall county line northwest of Clermont, and covers almost as far as Blairsville, Toccoa, and Cumming.

History
Prior to 2016, it was owned by Richard & Lisa Goetz of Hendersonville, Tennessee, who applied for the station in 2000 and were granted a permit in mid February 2004 as W28CV, which they changed the broadcast callsign of two weeks later, well before going on-air.

Its digital companion was WDWW-LD, a construction permit issued far to the southwest to serve Atlanta on channel 7.  This station began transmission from Sweat Mountain in early September 2009, but ceased a few months later.  The station used a directional antenna which sent the signal in an arc from south (toward Atlanta) to northeast (toward Cumming, the only slight overlap it had with its analog broadcast range).  It had a wide and total null toward the west and northwest in order to protect Alabama Public Television station WCIQ television at Mount Cheaha, thus it did not even reach nearby Woodstock, with which it had a direct line of sight.

The station later had this permit cancelled and instead applied for and received in early November 2010 a permit to make a flash cut on channel 28, while moving the station into Atlanta but at a different location than before.  It will now be located on the east tower at the North Druid Hills site, along with many other TV and FM stations.  Unlike the original digital companion channel, this permit retains Cleveland as its city of license instead of Atlanta.  The height above average terrain will be  versus  on Sweat Mountain.  The effective radiated power will be 15 kW instead of 300 watts, respectively about 0.3% and 0.1% of what is allowed for full-power stations on UHF and high VHF. The station was licensed for digital operation on November 28, 2017, and changed its call sign to WDWW-LD.

Digital channels

References

External links

Stadium (sports network) affiliates
Innovate Corp.
Television stations in Georgia (U.S. state)
Television channels and stations established in 2007
2007 establishments in Georgia (U.S. state)
Low-power television stations in the United States